Thompson Falls Hydroelectric Dam Historic District is an  historic district in Thompson Falls which includes six contributing buildings.  It is located on the Clark Fork River, on alternate U.S. Route 10, within the northwestern part of Thompson Falls at the Thompson Falls Dam.

It includes the St. Lukes Hospital, a two-story frame building built in 1910, which was the first community hospital in Thompson Falls.

References

Historic districts on the National Register of Historic Places in Montana
Buildings and structures completed in 1912
National Register of Historic Places in Sanders County, Montana
Dams on the National Register of Historic Places in Montana
Thompson Falls, Montana